Meet Miss Bobby Socks is a 1944 American musical comedy film directed by Glenn Tryon and starring Bob Crosby and Lynn Merrick. The film was released by Columbia Pictures on October 12, 1944.

Cast
Bob Crosby as Don Collins
Lynn Merrick as Helen Tyler
Louise Erickson as Susan Tyler
Robert White as Howard Barnes
Howard Freeman as Tom Tyler
Kim Loo Sisters as Speciality Act
Louis Jordan as Louis Jordan
The Tympany Five as themselves 
Bob Alden as Bob (uncredited)
Venna Archer as Jitterbug (uncredited)
Carla Balenda as Pillow (uncredited)
Gladys Blake as Mrs. Loomis (uncredited)
Marguerite Campbell as Bobby Sock Girl (uncredited)
Bill Chaney as Jitterbug (uncredited)
Mary Currier as Mrs. Tyler (uncredited)
Daisy as Thirsty (uncredited)
Pauline Drake as Receptionist (uncredited)
Toni Eden as Bobby Sock Girl (uncredited)
Raoul Freeman as Guard (uncredited)
Helen Gerald as Bobby Sock Girl (uncredited)
John Hamilton as R. N. Swanson (uncredited)
Rex Lease as Guard (uncredited)
Nelson Leigh as Henry Bricker (uncredited)
Teddy Mangean as Messenger (uncredited)
Alphonse Martell as Headwaiter (uncredited)
Forbes Murray as Colonel (uncredited)
Pat Parrish as Gloria (uncredited)
Joey Ray as Announcer (uncredited)
Syd Saylor as Harry Loomis (uncredited)
Michel Silva as Michel (uncredited)
John Tyrrell as Waiter Captain (uncredited)
Pierre Watkin as Quinlan (uncredited)
Florence Wix as Nightclub Patron (uncredited)
Douglas Wood as Principal Whitaker (uncredited)

Production
Robert White was cast on the basis of his performance on Broadway in Kiss and Tell. Filming took place in June 1944.

References

External links

Meet Miss Bobby Socks at TCMDB

1944 films
American musical comedy films
Columbia Pictures films
1944 musical comedy films
American black-and-white films
1940s English-language films
1940s American films